Khaled Omar Taja (November 6, 1939 – April 4, 2012) was a Syrian-Kurdish actor born in Rukneddine district in the city of Damascus. The poet Mahmoud Darwish called him "Anthony Quinn of the Arabs", he was ranked among the fifty best actors in the world according to the American Time magazine . He's credited for working alongside Salah Zulfikar in Memory of a Night of Love (1973). Taja worked in over 62 different TV series. He died at the age of 73 on April 4, 2012.

Career and filmography

Cinema 
 1973 – Memory of a Night of Love

Theater

TV series
 2000 – Al-Zeer Salem
 2001 – Salah Al-deen Al-Ayyobi
 2004 – Al-Taghriba Al-Filistinia

Awards
 Khaled Taja won the Best Actor Award for a Second Role for his performance in the Palestinian TV series Al-Taghreba al-Falastenya, at the Cairo Festival for Radio and Television, 2005.

See also
 Jay Abdo
 Maxim Khalil
 Ghassan Massoud
Hatem Ali
 List of Syrian television series

References

External links
 
 
 

Deaths from lung cancer
2012 deaths
1939 births
Syrian Muslims
Syrian Kurdish people
People from Damascus
Syrian male actors
21st-century Syrian male actors
20th-century Syrian male actors